Marian High School was a private, Roman Catholic, co-educational high school in Framingham, Massachusetts, United States. It was established in 1956 and was located in the Roman Catholic Archdiocese of Boston. It ran independently of the Diocese since 2004 and on April 3, 2018, the school's board voted unanimously to cease operations at the end of the 2018 school year, due to low enrollment.

Notable alumni 
 Peter Cronan, NFL player and color commentator
 Lida E. Harkins, politician
 Steven J. McAuliffe, judge
 Christa McAuliffe, teacher and astronaut
 Jay Miller, NHL player
 Brian Moran, politician
 Jim Moran, politician
 Dave Schuler, MLB player
 Fred Willis, former NFL player
 Cho Won-tae, businessman

References

External links 
 

Schools in Middlesex County, Massachusetts
Defunct Catholic secondary schools in Massachusetts
Educational institutions established in 1956
1956 establishments in Massachusetts
Educational institutions disestablished in 2018
2018 disestablishments in Massachusetts